General elections were held in the Bahamas on 19 July 1977. The result was a victory for the Progressive Liberal Party, which won 30 of the 38 seats. Voter turnout was 92.6%.

Results

Elected MPs

References

Bahamas
1977 in the Bahamas
Elections in the Bahamas
Bahamas
Election and referendum articles with incomplete results